Get Out is a 2017 American psychological horror film.

Get Out or get out may also refer to:

Albums
Get Out (album), a 1992 album by Capercaillie
Get Out! (album), a 2009 album by Cardiac Kidz

Songs
"Get Out" (song), 2018 song by Chvrches
"Leave (Get Out)", 2004 song by JoJo
"Get Out", 2012 song by Casey Abrams from the album Casey Abrams
"Get Out!", 2000 song by Busta Rhymes from the album Anarchy
"Get Out", 1979 song by Cardiac Kidz
"Get Out", 1995 song by Faith No More from the album King for a Day... Fool for a Lifetime
"Get Out", 2016 song by Frightened Rabbit from Painting of a Panic Attack
"Get Out", 1975 song by Tommy Hunt

Sports and gaming
In bat-and-ball sports, the act of preventing an offensive player from scoring, which forces them off the field
Out (baseball)
Out (cricket)
 get out (patience term), to succeed at patience or solitaire

Other uses
Get Out (board game), a game published by Cheapass Games

See also